Neutral alpha-glucosidase C is an enzyme that in humans is encoded by the GANC gene.

Function 

Glycoside hydrolase enzymes hydrolyse the glycosidic bond between two or more carbohydrates, or between a carbohydrate and a non-carbohydrate moiety. This gene encodes a member of glycosyl hydrolases family 31. This enzyme hydrolyses terminal, non-reducing 1,4-linked alpha-D-glucose residues and releases alpha-D-glucose. This is a key enzyme in glycogen metabolism and its gene localizes to a chromosomal region (15q15) that is associated with susceptibility to diabetes.

References

Further reading